Richard C. Trembath, Sr. (January 2, 1896 – March 17, 1964) was an American jurist and politician who served as a member of the Wisconsin State Assembly in 1925 and 1927.

Early life 
Born in Montreal, Wisconsin, Trembath graduated from Hurley High School in 1912, in Hurley, Wisconsin.

Career 
Trembath began his career as an educator. From 1917 to 1924, Trembath served as register of deeds for Iron County, Wisconsin as a Republican. In 1925 and 1927, Trembath served in the Wisconsin State Assembly. During his time in the Wisconsin Assembly, Trembath studied law at the University of Wisconsin Law School and was admitted to the Wisconsin bar in 1917. Trembath practiced law in Hurley, Wisconsin. He then served as district attorney for Iron County and on the Iron County Board of Supervisors. From 1938 until 1960, Trembath served as county judge for Iron County.

Death 
Trembath died at Grand View Hospital in Ironwood, Michigan. He was buried in Hurley.

Notes

External links

1896 births
1964 deaths
People from Montreal, Wisconsin
University of Wisconsin Law School alumni
Educators from Wisconsin
Wisconsin lawyers
Wisconsin state court judges
County supervisors in Wisconsin
County officials in Wisconsin
Republican Party members of the Wisconsin State Assembly
20th-century American judges
People from Hurley, Wisconsin
20th-century American politicians
20th-century American lawyers